Voikovskyi, renamed by Ukrainian authoirities to Kopani in 2016 due to decommunization, is a small urban-type settlement in Donetsk Raion of Donetsk Oblast, but was part of Amvrosiivka Raion before 2020. Voikovskyi has been the site of numerous cross-border skirmishes between Ukraine and Russia. Since 2014, the settlement has been occupied by the pro-Russian DPR which uses the old name and the old administrative division. Population:

Recent history
On August 24, 2014, a unit of the Armed Forces of Ukraine fell into an ambush. Defending against the ambush, police officer Yuri Smirnov opened fire, attempting to cover his unit as it regrouped. Twice the opposing forces overcame the column unit, yet the Ukrainian soldiers continued fighting, deterring enemy attacks until they were successfully repulsed. After the battle, Ukraine comrades recovered the body of Yuri Smirnov.

References 

Urban-type settlements in Donetsk Raion